Culture Shock is an American travel show hosted by Shenaz Treasurywala on the Travel Channel.  It premiered on Monday 9 April 2007 at 8pm ET/PT/7 pm CT.  The program's self-described aim is to search out the "peculiar customs and bizarre traditions" of various cultures around the world.  The pilot was being developed for a 13 episode series before the show was canceled.

Episodes

Notes

External links 
 Official site, now only existent on the Wayback Machine

Travel Channel original programming